Ellenabad railway station is a railway station in Sirsa district, Haryana. Its code is ENB. It serves Ellenabad town. The station consists of 3 platforms. Passenger, Express trains halt here.

References

Railway stations in Sirsa district
Bikaner railway division